South Hamgyong Province (Hamgyŏngnamdo) is a province of North Korea.  The province was formed in 1896 from the southern half of the former Hamgyong Province, remained a province of Korea until 1945, then became a province of North Korea. Its capital is Hamhung.

Geography
The province is bordered by Ryanggang to the north, North Hamgyong to the northeast, Kangwon to the south, and South Pyongan to the west.  On the east of the province is the Sea of Japan.

Administrative divisions
South Hamgyong is divided into three cities ("si"), two districts (one "gu" and one "chigu"), and 15 counties ("gun"). These are further divided into villages (ri and dong, with dong also denoting neighborhoods in cities), with each county additionally having one town (up) which acts as its administrative center. These are detailed on each county's individual page. Some cities are also divided into wards known as "guyok", which are administered just below the city level and also listed on the individual page.

Cities
 Hamhung (capital)함흥시 / 
 Sinpo 신포시 / 
 Tanchon 단천시 /

Districts
 Kumho-chigu 금호지구 /

Counties

See also

 Song of Dorang-seonbi and Cheongjeong-gaksi

References

External links 
 

 
Provinces of North Korea